Agnieszka Niedźwiedź is a Polish former mixed martial artist who last competed in the Flyweight division in Invicta FC. She fought for organizations like MMA Attack, Cage Warriors and Fighters Arena. In 2017, the year of her last recorded fight to date, she was ranked #2 in the world in the women's flyweight category.

Early life 
Niedźwiedź was sent to a Judo class by her mother at the age of seven. She continued to train for ten years, acquiring competition experience, until her brother convinced her to try Brazilian Jiu-Jitsu. After only two or three classes, Niedźwiedź was offered an MMA fight. Her next fight a month later would start her MMA career.

Mixed martial arts career

Early career
Niedźwiedź began her professional MMA career in October 2012 in her native Poland. Over the next year and a half, she amassed a record of 7 wins against no losses before joining Invicta FC.

Invicta FC
Niedźwiedź made her American debut at Invicta FC 18: Grasso vs. Esquibel against Christine Stanley and won via unanimous decision. She then fought Vanessa Porto at Invicta FC 23: Porto vs. Niedźwiedź and again won by unanimous decision.

On December 8, 2017, she faced Jennifer Maia for the Invicta FC flyweight title. She lost the fight via unanimous decision.

Niedźwiedź was offered a place on The Ultimate Fighter (TUF), but declined, citing her appreciation of the high skill level in Invicta FC and her reluctance to be apart from her young son.

Personal life 
Niedźwiedź was born in Katowice, Poland. She describes her main motivation as being her son, Alan. When asked what she would be doing if she was not doing MMA, she said: "My dream is to have my own baker’s shop as I love to bake pies and cakes. I really hope that dream will come true after [sic] MMA career".

Mixed martial arts record

|-
|Loss
|align=center|10–1
|Jennifer Maia
|Decision (unanimous)
|Invicta FC 26: Maia vs. Niedźwiedź
|
|align=center|5
|align=center|5:00
|Kansas City, Missouri
|For the Invicta FC Flyweight Championship.
|-
|Win
|align=center|10–0
|Vanessa Porto
|Decision (unanimous)
|Invicta FC 23: Porto vs. Niedźwiedź
|
|align=center|3
|align=center|5:00
|Kansas City, Missouri
|
|-
|Win
|align=center|9–0
|Samara Santos
|TKO (punches)
|Ladies Fight Night 4: Fortuna Dies Natalis
|
|align=center|3
|align=center|3:10
|Karpacz, Poland
|
|-
|Win
|align=center|8–0
|Christine Stanley
|Decision (unanimous)
|Invicta FC 18: Grasso vs. Esquibel
|
|align=center|3
|align=center|5:00
|Kansas City, Missouri
|
|-
|Win
|align=center|7–0
|Julija Stoliarenko
|TKO (elbows)
|Fighters Arena 9
|
|align=center|3
|align=center|2:51
|Józefów, Poland
|
|-
|Win
|align=center|6–0
|Gemma Hewitt
|Submission (triangle choke)
|Cage Warriors 67
|
|align=center|1
|align=center|3:59
|Swansea, Wales
|
|-
|Win
|align=center|5–0
|Kerry Hughes
|Decision (unanimous)
|Cage Warriors 62
|
|align=center|3
|align=center|5:00
|Newcastle, England
|
|-
|Win
|align=center|4–0
|Iren Racz
|Submission (armbar)
|Immortals Fight Promotions 1
|
|align=center|1
|align=center|3:47
|Aberdeen, Scotland
|
|-
|Win
|align=center|3–0
|Klaudia Apenit
|TKO (punches)
|MMA Attack 3
|
|align=center|2
|align=center|4:03
|Katowice, Poland
|
|-   
|Win
|align=center|2–0
|Joanna Ogrodnik
|TKO (punches)
|MMA Coloseum 12: The City of Kings
|
|align=center|2
|align=center|1:02
|Krakow, Poland
|
|-
|Win
|align=center|1–0
|Agnieszka Sobczyk
|TKO (corner stoppage)
|MMA Coloseum 11: Return of the King
|
|align=center|1
|align=center|3:24
|Jaslo, Poland
|
|-

References

External links
 
 Agnieszka Niedźwiedź at Invicta FC

1995 births
Polish female mixed martial artists
Polish female judoka
Sportspeople from Katowice
Living people
Flyweight mixed martial artists
Mixed martial artists utilizing judo